The 1963 Polish Speedway season was the 1963 season of motorcycle speedway in Poland.

Individual

Polish Individual Speedway Championship
The 1963 Individual Speedway Polish Championship was held on 8 September at Rybnik.

Golden Helmet
The 1963 Golden Golden Helmet organised by the Polish Motor Union (PZM) was the 1963 event for league's leading riders.

Calendar

Final classification
Note: Result from final score was subtracted with one the weakest events.

Team

Team Speedway Polish Championship
The 1963 Team Speedway Polish Championship was the 16th edition of the Team Polish Championship. Górnik Rybnik won the gold medal for the second consecutive season.

First League

Second League

References

Poland Individual
Poland Team
Speedway
1963 in Polish speedway